Radiobeta.com is an Internet radio portal that allows users to create a personalized online radio experience. Listeners may find, listen, save, and follow any station of the world that streams through the web. Users may also view, save and follow their shows and events, view their comments, and comment and chat with other listeners while listening to the radio. The service can be accessed through the web, desktop apps or mobile devices. Radiobeta has an app for Webmaster, which they can custom and monetize.

Basic functions

Radiobeta allows users to interact with the web phenomenon in several ways. Besides being able to search through name, location, genre, and language, users may view in real time the stations, shows and events, comments which they post on Twitter, Facebook or on Radiobeta portal. Listeners can chat with other listeners while they listen to the same station. Users may also suggest missing stations, shows or radio events, or edit the current one.

Users may register, which is free, to administrate their radio world. Registered user will have a desktop where they can save, follow and manage their stations, shows, events and other listeners. 
Through simple and useful applications Radiobeta is striving to create a powerful online radio environment. Their goal is to become the first and major global radio community.

Radiobeta app for webmaster
Webmasters may add the Radiobeta app to their site in order to allow their listeners to access all radio stations from the world. The Radiobeta App may be customized with the webmaster logo, own ads, their Twitter or Facebook accounts, RSS feed, or any external app embedded with the proper HTML code.

Facebook 
Facebook users can find Radiobeta on Facebook and become a fan to get radio news and learn about new features, promotions, and contests. There is a Radiobteta app for Facebook too.

Similar services

References

Recent articles 

Le téléchargement peut être légal et gratuit  Le Figaro April 22, 2009
Un mundo de radios en la computadora  La Nación May 15, 2009
Todas las radios en un solo sitio  Clarín May 28, 2009
Your Guide To Music On The Web - Part #1  TechCrunch August 22, 2009

External links 
Radiobeta.com main page

Internet radio in the United States
American music websites